Sébastien Roch may refer to:
 Sébastien Roch (novel)
 Sébastien Roch (singer)